Landmarks of Lunacy is the second extended play (EP) by British indie rock band Klaxons. Released on 25 December 2010, the album was available
for free download in their official website. The songs were rejected by their record label, Polydor, after the recording sessions for the second album, when they were deemed "too experimental."

Track listing 
 "The Pale Blue Dot" - 4:05
 "Silver Forest" - 3:29
 "Ivy Leaves" - 3:29
 "Wildeflowers" - 4:03
 "Marble Fields" - 7:19

References

External links 
 Official website of Klaxons

Klaxons albums
2010 EPs
Polydor Records albums